Thörnqvist or Thornqvist is a Swedish surname that may refer to:

Anna Thörnqvist (born 1995), Swedish footballer
Jan Thörnqvist (born 1959), Swedish Navy vice admiral
Owe Thörnqvist (born 1929), Swedish singer-songwriter and revue artist
Roland Thornqvist (born 1970), American college tennis coach and college tennis player

Swedish-language surnames